The Sky Ranger (aka The Man Who Stole the Moon) is a 1921 American 15-episode/chapter silent film serial. Directed by George B. Seitz who also starred with June Caprice, the film serial was an adventure film with locales as exotic as Tibet.  The plot staple of an inventor of aviation technology having to contend with conspirators who wish to steal the invention, often appeared in aviation films. The Sky Ranger is considered to be lost.

Plot
George Rockwell (George B. Seitz) is young and adventurous. He meets June (June Caprice), a beautiful young girl on the road and decides she will be his wife. But Professor Elliott (Frank Redman), June's father, has him thrown out the door. George does not give up and saves the Professor from his cousin Murdock (Joe Cuny), who was trying to kill him. Professor Elliott has made a number of important inventions, including developing a fast, silent aircraft. His latest work concerns a new, powerful light, which is the object of those criminals who want to steal the invention.

On the day of their engagement, George and June are abducted on an aircraft which takes them to Tibet. Dr. Santro (Harry Semels), Murdock's accomplice is the culprit. He and his wife Tharen (Peggy Shanor) leave the two in the hands of angry Tibetans. The two lovers are locked into a box with only a tiny hole in it through which they can see some food that is out of their reach. As if that was not enough suffering, one of the abductors decides to shoot them through the box.

George miraculously opens the box with a rock he had picked up before. As he tries to capture two horses, June is taken away in the desert by a Tibetan. George follows the traces left by his horse and rescues June in time.

Chapter titles

Out of the Clouds
The Sinister Signal
In Hostile Hands
Desert Law
Mid-Air
The Crystal Prism
Danger's Doorway
Dropped from the Clouds
The House on the Roof
Trapped
The Seething Pool
The Whirling Menace
At the Last Minute
Liquid Fire
The Last Raid

Cast
 George B. Seitz as George Oliver Rockwell
 June Caprice as June Elliott
 Harry Semels as Dr. Santro
 Frank Redman as Professor Elliott
 Joe Cuny as Murdock
 Peggy Shanor as Tharen
 Charles "Patch" Revada as Bean
 Spencer Gordon Bennet
 Tom Goodwin as The Butler (credited as Thomas Goodwin)
 Marguerite Courtot

Production
The Sky Ranger was not to be confused on the 1928 short film based on the popular "Russ Farrell" magazine stories and the film series, Russ Farrell, Aviator that stars Reed Howes as the dashing, devil-may-care flyboy hero.

Reception
When The Sky Ranger was released as a film serial with the first chapter playing on May 1, 1921, a decision was made to rename the serial to The Man Who Stole the Moon. The new title was a way to market the production as more of a science fiction film, capitalizing on interest in this genre. The Man Who Stole the Moon was compared to a similar film, A Message from Mars, a 1921 American silent fantasy comedy film released by Metro Pictures on April 11, 1921.

See also
 List of film serials
 List of film serials by studio
 List of lost films

References

Notes

Citations

Bibliography

 Farmer, James H. Celluloid Wings: The Impact of Movies on Aviation. Blue Ridge Summit, Pennsylvania: Tab Books Inc., 1984. .
 Flynn, John L. War of the Worlds: From Wells to Spielberg. Baltimore, Maryland: Galactic Books, 2005. .

External links

 
 
 

1921 films
American aviation films
American silent serial films
1921 comedy films
American black-and-white films
Films directed by George B. Seitz
Lost American films
Silent American comedy films
1921 lost films
Lost comedy films
1920s American films